Yuryevo is the name of several rural localities in Russia.

Ivanovo Oblast
As of 2010, two rural localities in Ivanovo Oblast bear this name:
Yuryevo, Puchezhsky District, Ivanovo Oblast, a village in Puchezhsky District
Yuryevo, Yuryevetsky District, Ivanovo Oblast, a village in Yuryevetsky District

Kaluga Oblast
As of 2010, one rural locality in Kaluga Oblast bears this name:
Yuryevo, Kaluga Oblast, a village in Sukhinichsky District

Kirov Oblast
As of 2010, one rural locality in Kirov Oblast bears this name:
Yuryevo, Kirov Oblast, a selo in Yuryevsky Rural Okrug of Kotelnichsky District

Kostroma Oblast
As of 2010, three rural localities in Kostroma Oblast bear this name:
Yuryevo, Antropovsky District, Kostroma Oblast, a village in Palkinskoye Settlement of Antropovsky District
Yuryevo, Kostromskoy District, Kostroma Oblast, a village in Minskoye Settlement of Kostromskoy District
Yuryevo, Ostrovsky District, Kostroma Oblast, a selo in Klevantsovskoye Settlement of Ostrovsky District

Lipetsk Oblast
As of 2010, one rural locality in Lipetsk Oblast bears this name:
Yuryevo, Lipetsk Oblast, a selo in Yuryevsky Selsoviet of Zadonsky District

Moscow
As of 2010, one rural locality in Moscow bears this name:
Yuryevo, Moscow, a village in Novofedorovskoye Settlement of Troitsky Administrative Okrug

Moscow Oblast
As of 2010, seven rural localities in Moscow Oblast bear this name:
Yuryevo, Dmitrovsky District, Moscow Oblast, a village in Sinkovskoye Rural Settlement of Dmitrovsky District
Yuryevo, Istrinsky District, Moscow Oblast, a village in Obushkovskoye Rural Settlement of Istrinsky District
Yuryevo, Mozhaysky District, Moscow Oblast, a village in Yurlovskoye Rural Settlement of Mozhaysky District
Yuryevo, Mytishchinsky District, Moscow Oblast, a village in Fedoskinskoye Rural Settlement of Mytishchinsky District
Yuryevo, Shakhovskoy District, Moscow Oblast, a village under the administrative jurisdiction of the work settlement of Shakhovskaya in Shakhovskoy District
Yuryevo, Volokolamsky District, Moscow Oblast, a village in Spasskoye Rural Settlement of Volokolamsky District
Yuryevo, Yegoryevsky District, Moscow Oblast, a village in Yurtsovskoye Rural Settlement of Yegoryevsky District

Nizhny Novgorod Oblast
As of 2010, one rural locality in Nizhny Novgorod Oblast bears this name:
Yuryevo, Nizhny Novgorod Oblast, a selo in Yuryevsky Selsoviet of Gaginsky District

Novgorod Oblast
As of 2010, five rural localities in Novgorod Oblast bear this name:
Yuryevo, Borovichsky District, Novgorod Oblast, a village in Konchansko-Suvorovskoye Settlement of Borovichsky District
Yuryevo, Novgorodsky District, Novgorod Oblast, a village in Rakomskoye Settlement of Novgorodsky District
Yuryevo, Okulovsky District, Novgorod Oblast, a village in Berezovikskoye Settlement of Okulovsky District
Yuryevo, Parfinsky District, Novgorod Oblast, a village in Fedorkovskoye Settlement of Parfinsky District
Yuryevo, Poddorsky District, Novgorod Oblast, a village in Poddorskoye Settlement of Poddorsky District

Omsk Oblast
As of 2010, one rural locality in Omsk Oblast bears this name:
Yuryevo, Omsk Oblast, a selo in Yuryevsky Rural Okrug of Kormilovsky District

Oryol Oblast
As of 2010, two rural localities in Oryol Oblast bear this name:
Yuryevo, Kolpnyansky District, Oryol Oblast, a village in Belokolodezsky Selsoviet of Kolpnyansky District
Yuryevo, Pokrovsky District, Oryol Oblast, a village in Vladimirovsky Selsoviet of Pokrovsky District

Pskov Oblast
As of 2010, two rural localities in Pskov Oblast bear this name:
Yuryevo, Dedovichsky District, Pskov Oblast, a village in Dedovichsky District
Yuryevo, Opochetsky District, Pskov Oblast, a village in Opochetsky District

Ryazan Oblast
As of 2010, one rural locality in Ryazan Oblast bears this name:
Yuryevo, Ryazan Oblast, a selo in Yuryevsky Rural Okrug of Pitelinsky District

Tula Oblast
As of 2010, two rural localities in Tula Oblast bear this name:
Yuryevo, Leninsky District, Tula Oblast, a village in Inshinsky Rural Okrug of Leninsky District
Yuryevo, Plavsky District, Tula Oblast, a village in Prigorodny Rural Okrug of Plavsky District

Tver Oblast
As of 2010, five rural localities in Tver Oblast bear this name:
Yuryevo, Dmitrovogorskoye Rural Settlement, Konakovsky District, Tver Oblast, a village in Dmitrovogorskoye Rural Settlement of Konakovsky District
Yuryevo, Kozlovskoye Rural Settlement, Konakovsky District, Tver Oblast, a village in Kozlovskoye Rural Settlement of Konakovsky District
Yuryevo, Molokovsky District, Tver Oblast, a village in Akhmatovskoye Rural Settlement of Molokovsky District
Yuryevo, Sandovsky District, Tver Oblast, a selo in Starosandovskoye Rural Settlement of Sandovsky District
Yuryevo, Torzhoksky District, Tver Oblast, a village in Gruzinskoye Rural Settlement of Torzhoksky District

Vologda Oblast
As of 2010, one rural locality in Vologda Oblast bears this name:
Yuryevo, Vologda Oblast, a village in Leskovsky Selsoviet of Vologodsky District

Yaroslavl Oblast
As of 2010, six rural localities in Yaroslavl Oblast bear this name:
Yuryevo, Danilovsky District, Yaroslavl Oblast, a village in Maryinsky Rural Okrug of Danilovsky District
Yuryevo, Lyubimsky District, Yaroslavl Oblast, a village in Osetsky Rural Okrug of Lyubimsky District
Yuryevo, Nekrasovsky District, Yaroslavl Oblast, a village in Diyevo-Gorodishchensky Rural Okrug of Nekrasovsky District
Yuryevo, Uglichsky District, Yaroslavl Oblast, a village in Putchinsky Rural Okrug of Uglichsky District
Yuryevo, Levtsovsky Rural Okrug, Yaroslavsky District, Yaroslavl Oblast, a village in Levtsovsky Rural Okrug of Yaroslavsky District
Yuryevo, Nekrasovsky Rural Okrug, Yaroslavsky District, Yaroslavl Oblast, a village in Nekrasovsky Rural Okrug of Yaroslavsky District